The École nationale supérieure d'informatique et de mathématiques appliquées, or Ensimag, is a prestigious French Grande École located in Grenoble, France. Ensimag is part of the Institut polytechnique de Grenoble (Grenoble INP). The school is one of the top French engineering institutions and specializes in computer science, applied mathematics and telecommunications.

In the fields of computer science and applied mathematics, Ensimag ranks first in France, as measured by the position of its students in the national admission examinations and by the ranking of companies hiring its students and specialized media.

Students are usually admitted to Ensimag competitively following two years of undergraduate studies in classes préparatoires aux grandes écoles. Studies at Ensimag are of three years' duration and lead to the French degree of "Diplôme National d'Ingénieur" (equivalent to a master's degree).

Grenoble, in the French Alps, has always been a pioneer for high-tech engineering education in France. The first French school of electrical engineering has been created in Grenoble in 1900 (one of the first in the world after MIT). In 1960 the eminent French mathematician Jean Kuntzmann founded Ensimag. Since that time it has become the highest ranking French engineering school in computer science and applied mathematics.

About 250 students graduates from the school each year in its different degrees, and counts with more than 5500 alumni worldwide.

Ensimag Graduate specializations

Ensimag's curriculum offers a variety of compulsory and elective advanced courses, making up specific profiles.
Most of the common core courses are taught in the first year and the first semester of the second year, allowing students to acquire the basics in applied mathematics and informatics. 
Students then choose a graduate specialization.

Financial Engineering
 Financial Mathematics
 Mathematics and Informatics for Finance
 Computer Systems for Finance

Software and Systems Engineering 	
 Architecture of Complex Systems
 Security
 Information Systems

Mathematical modeling, Vision, Graphics and Simulation 
 Modeling, Calculus,  Simulation
 Images, Virtual Reality and Multimedia
 Decision-making
 Bio-informatics

Embedded Systems and Connected Devices
 Software, hardware and systems for embedded and intelligent applications
 High level modeling, virtual prototyping and validation of complex systems
 Control theory and informatics
 Architecture and telecommunication services
 Networks transmission systems

International master’s programmes (Courses in English) 
Master of Science in Informatics at Grenoble 
Since September 2008, a joint degree programme with Université Joseph Fourier. Highly competitive, two-year graduate program offering training in the areas of:
 Distributed Embedded Mobile and Interactive Systems
 Graphics, Vision and Robotics
 AI and the Web
 Security and Cryptology of Information Systems. This program is common between the Grenoble INP and the Université Grenoble Alpes.
Website: http://mosig.imag.fr/

Master in Communication Systems Engineering
Offered jointly by Ensimag and Politecnico di Torino (Italy)
This course aims to train engineers to specialize in the design and management of communication systems, ranging from simple point-to-point transmissions to diversified telecommunications networks. 
A four-semester course:
 First and second semesters taught at Politecnico di Torino
 Third semester taught at Grenoble INP
 Fourth semester: Master's Thesis
Website: http://cse.ensimag.fr

Research at Ensimag
Ensimag students can perform research work as part of their curriculum in second year, as well as a second-year internship and their end of studies project in a research laboratory. 15% of Ensimag graduates choose to pursue a Ph.D.

Junior enterprise: Nsigma
Nsigma was founded on November 17, 1980 as a voluntary association under the name ENSIGMA PROGRAMMATION. This association obtained the label Junior-Entreprise ® in 1981 and managed to renew it every year since then. The Junior enterprise took advantage of the Ensimag reform in 2008 to update its status and title. Currently called Nsigma, it is now an information technology service provider.

Website: http://nsigma.fr/

External links
 (fr) The official Ensimag website
 (en) The official Ensimag website

References

Informatique et de mathématiques appliquées de Grenoble
Grenoble Tech Ensimag
Grenoble Tech Ensimag
Grenoble Tech Ensimag
Grenoble Tech Ensimag
Grenoble Tech Ensimag
Grenoble Tech Ensimag
Educational institutions established in 1960
1960 establishments in France